The 1945 Maine Black Bears football team was an American football team that represented the University of Maine as a member of the New England Conference during the 1945 college football season. In its third and final season under head coach William C. Kenyon, the team compiled a 0–5 record (0–3 against conference opponents) and was outscored by a total of 101 to 32.  The team played its home games at Alumni Field in Orono, Maine. John Day was the team captain.

Schedule

References

Maine
Maine Black Bears football seasons
College football winless seasons
Maine Black Bears football